Mordecai Schreiber is an American Reform rabbi and an author of about 60 books.

Biography
Schreiber was born in Haifa, Israel in 1939. He saw the State of Israel being born and told about it in his memoir Land of Dreams, as well as in his recent book Three Founders of Israel: Ben-Gurion, Begin and Stern. He recently completed a new book project on Moses and leadership with an Episcopal and a Muslim scholars.

He has served as a rabbi in the United States and Guatemala. He has assisted the US government as an expert during trials of several former Nazis who settled in the USA.  He is the founder of the Agnon School in Cleveland, Ohio, renamed the Mandel School.

He is married to Hanita Schreiber, former CEO of a United Health HMO in Washington, DC. His son Joel Schreiber is a financial planner in Montclair, NJ. His daughter Rachel Schreiber is the new executive dean of the Parsons School of Design in New York City. His younger daughter Marla Schulman is the president of Schreiber Translations in Rockville, MD, a major provider of technical translations to the U.S. Government which Schreiber founded in 1979.

Bibliography 
 How Millennials Can Lead Us out of the Mess We're In: A Jew, a Muslim and a Christian Share Leadership Lessons from the Life of Moses
 The Sage: Life's Key Questions
 Explaining the Holocaust : How and Why it Happened
 Land of Dreams: An Israeli Childhood
 Moon in the Pail (A Neo--Picaresque Tale
 The Shengold Jewish Encyclopedia
 Why People Pray: The Universal Power of Prayer
 Hearing the Voice of God: In Search of Prophecy 
 The Rabbi and the Nun: A Love Story
 The Man Who Knew God: Decoding Jeremiah
 Begin: His Life and Legacy (With Hillel Seidman)
 Light to the Nations: World Peace from Biblical Promise to Human Action
 Three Founders of Israel
 Shabbat & Holiday Songster: A Companion for all Reform Services around the year

As Morry Sofer
 Ask the Bible: The Most Commonly Asked Questions about the Old Testament
 Light to the Nations: World Peace from Biblical Promise to Human Action
 The Global Translator's Handbook

Translated from Hebrew
 Sparks of Glory
 Wanted
 Light in the Darkness
 Glimmers of Light in a Betraying Land
Also: technical books for translators

References

External links 
Official homepage

American rabbis
American writers
1939 births
Living people
21st-century American Jews